Cynotilapia is a genus of haplochromine cichlids. All fishes in these genus form part of the mbuna flock, the rock-dwelling fishes of Lake Malawi, in the rift valley of East Africa. All species are polygamous, maternal, ovophile mouthbrooders and carry their fry in this fashion for about 20–30 days.

Species
There are currently 2 recognized species in this genus, although some authorities recognise 5:

 Cynotilapia afra (Günther, 1894)
 Cynotilapia aurifrons (Tawil, 2011)
 Cynotilapia axelrodi W. E. Burgess, 1976
 Cynotilapia chilundu Li, Konings & Stauffer, 2016
 Cynotilapia zebroides (D. S. Johnson, 1975)

FishBase places C. aurifroms and C. zebroides in the genus Microchromis.

References

 

Cichlid genera
Taxa named by Charles Tate Regan